Abu Samah bin Mahat is a Malaysian politician who served as Member of Legislative Assembly for Johol from 2013 to 2018. He was a member of United Malays National Organisation (UMNO), a component party of Barisan Nasional (BN).

Election results

Honours
  :
  Knight Commander of the Order of Loyalty to Negeri Sembilan (DPNS) – Dato' (2018)

References 

Living people
People from Negeri Sembilan
United Malays National Organisation politicians
Members of the Negeri Sembilan State Legislative Assembly
Year of birth missing (living people)